Moon is a studio album by Canadian musician Kenny Wheeler and British pianist John Taylor, recorded in 2001 and released on Egea Records. The album also features clarinetist Gabriele Mirabassi on some tracks.

Reception

The authors of The Penguin Guide to Jazz awarded the album 3 stars, commenting: "many beautiful moments for this long-standing partnership". In a review for All About Jazz, Enzo Vizzone wrote: "Wheeler and Taylor have produced some great music together in the past, but seldom as irresistibly gorgeous as this... The material, six originals by Wheeler, three by Taylor, allow free rein to their imagination and the results are sublime, their beauty enhanced by the sensitively detailed recording".

Track listing
All compositions by Kenny Wheeler unless otherwise noted.

"After the Last Time" (John Taylor) - 4:23
"Flo" - 4:59
"Ambleside" (Taylor) - 6:03
"Introduction to No Particular Song" - 7:07
"Moon"	(Taylor) - 4:46
"Sly Eyes" - 7:53
"3/4 P.M." - 5:36
"Derivation" - 5:55
"Medium 30" - 3:53

Personnel
Kenny Wheeler - flugelhorn
John Taylor - piano
Gabriele Mirabassi - clarinet

References

Kenny Wheeler albums
2001 albums
Collaborative albums